Dabir Uddin Ahmed (1 November 1927 – 2 June 1996) is a Bangladesh Awami League politician and the former Member of Parliament of the then Pabna-4 (now Sirajganj-4). He was the organizer of the Liberation War of Bangladesh.

Early life 
Ahmed was born on 1 November 1927 in the village of Bangala in Ullapara upazila of Sirajganj district. His father was Samatullah Akand. He started his legal career in Sirajganj in 1958 with a bachelor's degree in law from University of Dhaka.

Career 
Ahmed was a lawyer. He was the organizer of the Liberation War of Bangladesh. He joined the Awami League in 1956. He played a role in the language movement at Dhaka University. He was elected to parliament from the then Pabna-4 (now Sirajganj-4) as a Bangladesh Awami League candidate in 1973.

Death 
Ahmed died on 2 June 1996.

References 

1927 births
1996 deaths
People from Sirajganj District
University of Dhaka alumni
Awami League politicians
1st Jatiya Sangsad members